Healthy Child Manitoba is an interdepartmental committee within the Executive Council of Manitoba that deals with policies, programs, and services related to the well-being of children and youth in Manitoba.

The Healthy Child Committee of Cabinet is composed of six ministers:

 Education and Training
 Families
 Health, Seniors and Active Living
 Indigenous and Municipal Relations
 Justice
 Sport, Culture and Heritage

List of ministers responsible for Healthy Child Manitoba
From 2003 to 2012, the Executive Council of Manitoba has included a minister responsible for Healthy Child Manitoba, a position that is not a full cabinet portfolio.

References

See also 

 Roots of Empathy

Manitoba government departments and agencies
Executive Council of Manitoba